Raman is a name of Indian origin, used both as a family name and as both a feminine and a masculine given name. Raman is also a Belarusian variant of the given name Roman. There may be other origins also.

Surname 

 Avadhanam Sita Raman (19192001), Indian writer, journalist and editor
 Aneesh Raman (active from 2005), American journalist and entrepreneur
 Aroon Raman (active from 1991), Indian entrepreneur and author
 B. Raman (19362013), Indian intelligence officer
 Bangalore Venkata Raman (191298), Indian astrologer and writer
 Benito Raman (born 1994), Belgian footballer
 Bhavani Raman, Indian historian
 C. Raman (active 1960), Indian civil servant and administrator
 C. V. Raman (Chandrasekhara Venkata Raman; 18881970), Indian physicist who won the 1930 Nobel Prize for Physics
 Raman scattering (AKA Raman effect), inelastic photon scattering, for the discovery of which C. V. Raman was awarded the Nobel Prize
 Raman spectroscopy, a technique which relies on Raman scattering
 Raman amplification, used in optical fibres
 For other articles connected with C. V. Raman and with Raman scattering and spectroscopy, see the article on C. V. Raman
 Dinesh Raghu Raman (died 2007), Indian Army officer posthumously awarded the Ashoka Chakra for bravery
 E. S. S. Raman (born 1954), Indian politician 
 K. Raman (active 2019), Indian politician
 Krishnan Raman, Commander-in-chief of the Chola forces under Rajendra Chola
 Mohan Raman (born 1956), Indian film and television actor and management trainer
 Mythili Raman (active from 2013), American lawyer
 P. S. Raman (born 1960), Indian lawyer
 Pallathu Raman (18921950), Indian poet, writer, social reformer and community leader
 Prawaal Raman (active from 2000), Indian film director and screenwriter
 Priya Raman (active 199399), Indian actress and film producer in Malayalam
 Radha Raman (disambiguation)
 Sarangapani Raman (1920after 1948), Indian footballer
 Sumanth C. Raman (active from 1995), Indian television anchor and sports commentator in Tamil
 Sundar Raman (born 1971 or 1972), Indian sports business professional
 T. V. Raman (born 1965), Indian computer scientist
 Theruvath Raman (19172009), Indian journalist, writer, publisher and social activist
 U. C. Raman (born 1965), Indian politician
 V. P. Raman (193291), Indian lawyer and politician
 Varadaraja V. Raman (born 1932), Indian-born American academic in the field of humanities
 Vidyullekha Raman (born 1991), Indian film actress and theatre performer
 Vimala Raman (active from 2006), Indian film actress, model and Bharatanatyam dancer
 Woorkeri Raman (born 1965), Indian international cricketer

Given name: Indian origin 

 Laxmi Raman Acharya (191497), Indian politician
 Raman Bedi (active from 1996), English academic and organiser in the field of dental care
 Raman Bhardwaj (active from 1997), Scottish broadcast journalist, television presenter and producer
 Yussif Raman Chibsah (born 1993), Ghanaian footballer
 Raman Ghosh (active 1960s1970s), Indian badminton player
 Raman Kalyan (active 2015), Indian Carnatic flute player
 Rewati Raman Khanal (active 2014), Nepali litterateur
 Raman Lamba (196098), Indian international cricketer
 Raman Mahadevan (active from 2003), Indian playback singer
 Raman Malhotra (born 1968), British ophthalmologist and oculoplastic surgeon
 Raman Maroo (active 2010), Indian film producer
 Raman Mundair (active from 1998), Indian-born British poet, writer, artist and playwright
 Vaisravanath Raman Namboothiri (active 196090), Indian Sanskrit scholar and activist
 Erkkara Raman Nambudiri (18981983), Indian priest and scholar who helped revive the ancient Vedam-Yajnam traditions in Kerala
 Raman Osman (190292), Governor General of Mauritius 197277
 Raman Parimala (born 1948), Indian mathematician
 C. V. Raman Pillai (18581922), Indian novelist, playwright and journalist in Malayalam
 Chenganoor Raman Pillai (18861980), Indian Kathakali artist
 Kappazhom Raman Pillai (18681924), Indian civil servant in Travancore who achieved the office of Dewan Peishcar
 Raman Raghav (AKA Psycho Raman; 192995), Indian serial killer
 Dilli Raman Regmi (19132001), Nepali scholar, political figure and historian
 Raman Subba Row (born 1932), English international cricketer
 Raman Sharma (194599), Indian cricket umpire
 Radha Raman Shastri (born 1943), Indian politician, former Speaker of the Legislative Assembly of Himachal Pradesh
 Raman Sukumar (born 1965), Indian ecologist
 Raman Pratap Singh (born before 1994), Fijian lawyer and politician
 Raman Singh (born 1952), Indian politician
 Rewati Raman Singh (born 1943), Indian politician
 Raman Patrick Sisupalan (born 1980), English footballer
 Raman Sundrum (born before 1990), American theoretical physicist after whom the RandallSundrum model is named
 Raman Srivastava (born before 1973), former Director General of the Indian Border Security Force
 Raman Vijayan (born 1977), Indian association football manager and former player

Given name: Belarusian origin 

 Raman Astapenka (born 1980), Belarusian professional footballer
 Raman Hrabarenka (AKA Roman Graborenko; born 1992), Belarusian professional ice hockey player
 Raman Jaraš (born 1978), Belarusian musician
 Raman Kirenkin (born 1981), Belarusian international footballer
 Raman Makarau (active 2004), Belarusian paralympic swimmer who competed in the 2004 Paralympic Games
 Raman Piatrushenka (AKA Roman Petrushenko; born 1980), Belarusian sprint canoer who has competed in three Summer Olympics
 Raman Pratasevich (or Roman Protasevich; born 1995), Belarusian journalist
 Raman Ramanau (born 1994), Belarusian professional racing cyclist
 Raman Skirmunt (18681939), Belarusian statesman, aristocrat and landlord
 Raman Stsyapanaw (born 1991), Belarusian footballer
 Raman Tsishkou (born 1994), Belarusian professional racing cyclist.
 Raman Vasilyuk (born 1978), Belarusian footballer

Given name: Other or uncertain origin 

 Raman Hui (born 1963), Hong Kong animator and film director

Surnames of Indian origin
Indian unisex given names
Belarusian masculine given names